Tuz Khurmatu Air Base is a former Iraqi Air Force base in the Saladin Governorate of Iraq, located approximately  north of Baghdad, and about  west of Tuz Khurmatu. The base was seized by U.S.-led Coalition forces during Operation Iraqi Freedom in 2003. After its capture, it became a U.S. Army Forward Operating Base and renamed FOB Bernstein. The base was handed over to the Iraqi army in January 2006.

References

Saladin Governorate
Iraqi Air Force bases